Jagdev Singh Waraich (born 20 November 1962) also known as JS Waraich, is a former National and International Athlete (Hammer Throw) from India. Currently, he is working with ONGC as General Manager at Dehradun. Earlier, he held the position of Head Corporate Sports with ONGC at Delhi. He was also General Secretary of All India Public Sector Sports Promotion Board (AIPSSPB),

Achievements

National Level

International Level

Other Achievements 

 15 years continuously PSPB Champion
 10 years continuously AIPSSPB Champion
 Many Silver & Bronze medal from National Athletics meet/ Federation Cup/ Championships.
 New National Record in Hammer Throw event at Singapore in 1993 after the gap of 24 years.

Awards 

 Jaideep Singhji Award by Government of Gujarat in the year 1990.
 Award of Honour by PSPB in the year 1994
 Sports person of the year by ONGC in the year 1994
 Eklavya Award by Government of Gujarat in the year 1996.
 Maharaja Ranjit Singh Award by the Government of Punjab in the year 2006.

References 

Living people
Indian male hammer throwers
1962 births
Punjab, India